The La Salle Green Hills Greenies (officially the CSB–LSGH Greenies in the NCAA, although sometimes incorrectly called the La Salle Green Hills Junior Blazers, or the La Salle Green Hills Junior Archers) is the varsity team representing La Salle Green Hills (located in Mandaluyong, Metro Manila, Philippines) is the junior affiliate team of the St. Benilde Blazers in the NCAA. Since LSGH is an all-boys school, the Greenies do not have a girls' team.

History 
La Salle Green Hills' varsity team started as the La Salle Green Hills Rangers from the opening of the school in 1959 until it entered the NCAA as the juniors team representing De La Salle University in 1968, thus renaming them the La Salle Green Hills Greenies. The Greenies enjoyed the spotlight as the NCAA juniors team of the then De La Salle College in Manila (the High School in DLSC was phased out effective 1968 and all its grade school graduates went to La Salle Green Hills High School), winning 8 general championships along the way, until both DLSU and LSGH simultaneously formally withdrew from the NCAA in a press conference in September 1980 effective after the then ongoing 1980-81 NCAA Season.

With De La Salle University 
The Greenies entered the NCAA as the Junior Reps of then De La Salle College in 1968. LSGH took over the slot of the phased out De La Salle College High School which also had the same monikers-the Greenies.  That initial NCAA stint of the LSGH Greenies lasted until school year 1980–81 when both DLSU and LSGH formally and simultaneously withdrew from the NCAA.  Within that 13-year NCAA period, the Greenies won eight NCAA General Championships. DLSU together with LSGH withdrew from the NCAA due to several brawls between LSGH and main rivals Ateneo de Manila High School, and between DLSU and main rival school Letran. And when DLSU applied for the UAAP in 1981, a number of schools (mainly UST and Ateneo de Manila, because they stated that La Salle's entry would spark the infamous rivalry and thus start riots once more) rejected La Salle's application. But after a thorough review by the then UAAP board, they finally accepted La Salle as the eighth member. Ateneo de Manila also rejected LSGH's application after LSGH's athletes were involved in various riots with some Ateneo Blue Eaglets while they were in the NCAA, this delayed DLSU's spot in the UAAP, thus forcing DLSU to choose the newly established De La Salle–Santiago Zobel School as their representatives in the Juniors' Division.

But in the annual Fil-Oil/ Flying V Homegrown Invitational which started in 2005, the La Salle Greenies were selected to be the juniors team of the De La Salle Green Archers, thus being the first time the Greenies played alongside the Green Archers since 1981. Both the Greenies and the Zobel Junior Archers have since been participating in the said annual pre-season tourney.

In the spirit of De La Salle Philippines's "One La Salle"(all 18-La Salle campuses in the Philippines are under De La Salle Philippines. Inc.), the La Salle Greenies are currently CSB's junior reps in the NCAA while the Zobel Junior Archers are DLSU's junior reps in the UAAP.

With De La Salle–College of Saint Benilde 
When DLSU and DLSZ entered the UAAP in 1986, La Salle Green Hills was left without a membership in either the UAAP or the NCAA, thus starting a 17-year drought in a major collegiate league since its formal withdrawal from the NCAA in 1981. La Salle Green Hills however continued participating in several major grade school and high school leagues like the PAYA, Nike, RIFA Football League, Baseball Pony League, PRADA, MMBL, Fr. Martin's Cup etc. where a lot of athletes excelled and brought honor to LSGH and went on to play in the UAAP and the PBA.

De La Salle–College of Saint Benilde, a brother college of De La Salle University, applied for admission to the NCAA thru the efforts of then De La Salle University President Brother Andrew Gonzalez FSC and the La Salle Green Hills President Brother Bernard Oca FSC, who selected the Greenies to be the juniors team. Both De La Salle–College of Saint Benilde and La Salle Green Hills were admitted to the NCAA in 1998. Although the team name of La Salle Green Hills is Greenies, the school's official moniker is the Green Archer (taken from the former De La Salle Greenies of the, now defunct, De La Salle High School in Taft).

Since then they have won four General Championships and championships in various events, particularly football, where they are current five peat champions;  lawn tennis, track & field, and swimming with a number of championships. The basketball team has also had a fair share of luck, but the closest they have gotten to the Championship was second overall in 2011–2012 and 2013–2014. If third party circumstances (see Ateneo-La Salle rivalry) did not occur, La Salle Green Hills would have been the rightful team to be the juniors of DLSU.

NCAA Season 94 (A.Y. 2018–19) Team Roster

The La Salle Green Hills Greenies Basketball Team Roster

NCAA Season 93 (A.Y. 2017–18) Team Roster

The La Salle Green Hills Greenies Basketball Team Roster

References 

National Collegiate Athletic Association (Philippines) teams